Thailand competed at the 31st Southeast Asian Games which was held from 12 to 23 May 2022 in Hanoi, Vietnam.

Medal summary

Medal by sport

Medal by date

Medalists
The following Thailand competitors won medals at the Games.

Gold

Silver

Bronze

References

2022 in Thai sport
2021
Nations at the 2021 Southeast Asian Games